Amiga Computing was a monthly computer magazine of a serious nature, published by Europress and IDG in both the UK and USA. A total of 117 issues came out. The games section was called Gamer, although later Amiga Action was incorporated into the magazine and became the games section.

History 
The magazine's first 80 issues were published by Europress, known as Database Publications from June 1988 to March 1990, Interactive Publishing from April 1990 to May 1991, and finally as Europress Publications From June 1991 until December 1994. It was then sold to IDG and published by them starting Christmas 1994 and until its final 117th issue in October 1997.

See also 

 Amiga Survivor

References

External links 
 Amiga History Guide: Amiga Computing history
 David Viner - UK Computer Magazines
 Digitized archive

Defunct computer magazines published in the United Kingdom
Amiga magazines
Magazines established in 1988
Magazines disestablished in 1997
Video game magazines published in the United Kingdom
Video game magazines published in the United States